Roshani Chokshi (born February 14, 1991) is an American children's book author and a New York Times bestselling author.

Personal life 
Chokshi's mother is Filipino and her father is Indian, both immigrants to the United States. She grew up speaking English, rather than her parents' native languages, Tagalog and Gujarati. Chokshi was raised on Hindu mythology, which she often draws on in her novels. Her first novel sold while she attended law school at University of Georgia, and she ultimately dropped out to pursue writing. She cites Neil Gaiman as one of her influences to pursue a writing career.

Chokshi lives in Georgia, US.

Career 
Chokshi's first young adult novel, novel The Star-Touched Queen, was published by St. Martin's Press in 2016. Her second young adult novel, A Crown of Wishes, is set in the same world and was published in 2017.

All of Chokshi's first novels in her series debuted on the New York Times bestseller list.

Her middle grade debut, Aru Shah and the End of Time, was the first title to launch under author Rick Riordan's Disney-Hyperion imprint, Rick Riordan Presents, in 2018. In April 2018, it was announced that Paramount Pictures won the movie rights, at auction, for Aru Shah and the End of Time. The Aru Shah series was originally intended to be four books long, but later discussions between Chokshi and the imprint led to the series being extended to end with fifth book, that was released in 2022.

The Gilded Wolves was published in 2019, the first novel of a trilogy and the start of Chokshi's second young adult series.

Works

Young adult novels

The Star Touched Queen series 

 The Star-Touched Queen (2016)
 A Crown of Wishes (2017)
 Death and Night (novella, 2017)
 Star-Touched Stories (collection, 2018), collection of three novellas including "Death and Night"

The Gilded Wolves series 

The Gilded Wolves (2019)
The Silvered Serpents (2020)
The Bronzed Beasts (2021)

Middle grade novels

Pandava Quintet 

Aru Shah and the End of Time  (2018)
Aru Shah and the Song of Death (2019)
Aru Shah and the Tree of Wishes (2020)
Aru Shah and the City of Gold (2021)
Aru Shah and the Nectar of Immortality (2022)

Standalone Books 
The Spirit Glass (2023)

Adult Books 
The Last Tale of the Flower Bride (2023)

Short stories 

The Vishakanya's Choice (Book Smugglers Publishing, 2015)
The Wives of Azhar (Strange Horizons, 2015)
"Forbidden Fruit" in A Thousand Beginnings and Endings (Greenwillow Books, 2018)
"Trade at the Fox wedding" (Mythic Delirium Books, 2016)

Awards 
2020 Southern Book Prize (for The Gilded Wolves)

Nominations

2020 Georgia Author of the Year (for Aru Shah and the Song of Death)

2017 Locus Award for Best First Novel (for The Star-Touched Queen)

2017 Andre Norton Award (for The Star-Touched Queen)

References

External links
 
 

21st-century American women writers
21st-century American novelists
 American people of Filipino descent
American people of Indian descent
American fantasy writers
American women novelists
American children's writers
American young adult novelists
Living people
1991 births
Woodward Academy alumni
Writers from St. Louis
American women children's writers
Women writers of young adult literature
Women science fiction and fantasy writers
Novelists from Missouri